Prospect Hill is a heritage-listed hill in Pemulwuy and Prospect in the greater western region of Sydney, New South Wales, Australia.

The site is a former industrial building, agricultural farms, quarry, rural housing, research facility and pastoral property and now industrial building, housing, park, public park, brick quarry and pastoral property. The site is also known as Bellevue (Hill), Mar-Rong Reserve, Greystanes Hill or Mur-rong in 1790. The property is owned by Boral Limited and CSIRO. The site was added to the New South Wales State Heritage Register on 17 October 2003.

Prospect Hill is a “nodal point” of the Cumberland Plain. Its summit affords a “goodly prospect” west to the Blue Mountains and east to the man-made landmarks of central Sydney. People have walked round and over Prospect Hill for 30,000 years and have recognised it as a landmark, a meeting place and a boundary. It was known to local people as Mar-rong. For today's Australians it has historic significance, aesthetic values and commercial values. There are extensive industrial and housing developments on its slopes. The hill has a number of summits, with the Main Summit, now within Marrong Reserve, being the most popular for visitors.

Oval in shape, the hill has historical significance as one of the first places in the fledgling Colony of New South Wales where liberated convicts were granted land to farm. Furthermore, the settlements on Prospect Hill were a focus of significant antagonism between the indigenous people and the European settlers throughout the 1790s. For over 180 years quarrying of the igneous rock there, mainly teschenite, for roadstone and other building materials has been an important activity. The hill started to form around 200 million years ago when volcanic material from the Earth's core was thrust upwards and then sideways into joints in the layers of Triassic shales of the Cumberland Plain Woodland.

History

Indigenous history
The area of Prospect Reservoir is an area of known Aboriginal occupation, with favourable camping locations along the Eastern Creek and Prospect Creek catchments, and in elevated landscapes to the south. There is also evidence to suggest that the occupation of these lands continued after European contact, through discovery of intermingled glass and stone flakes in archaeological surveys of the place. The area was settled by Europeans by 1789.

European discovery

Very early after first settlement, on 26 April 1788, an exploration party heading west led by Governor Phillip, climbed Prospect Hill. An account by Phillip states that the exploration party saw from Prospect Hill, "for the first time since we landed Carmathen [sic] Hills (Blue Mountains) as likewise the hills to the southward". Phillip's "Bellevue" (Prospect Hill) acquired considerable significance for the new settlers. Prospect Hill provided a point from which distances could be meaningfully calculated, and became a major reference point for other early explorers. Statements that Prospect Hill is the hill named Belle-Vue by Governor Phillip on its ascent by his expedition in April 1788 are unsubstantiated in contemporary record.

When Captain-Lieutenant Watkin Tench made another official journey to the west in 1789, he began his journey with reference to Prospect Hill, which commanded a view of the great chain of mountains to the west. A runaway convict, George Bruce, used Prospect Hill as a hideaway from soldiers in the mid-1790s. The first recorded ascent of Prospect Hill by a colonist is that of Tench and his party on 26 June 1789. While there is no documentary evidence of Tench having named Prospect Hill, there is no doubt that it is in fact the hill that was shortly afterwards known by that name. In view of Tench's literary allusions to Milton's Paradise Lost, it seems highly probable that the experience of climbing it reminded him of the "goodly prospect of some forein land first-seen" by Milton's scout and that it was indeed Tench who first named it.

The earliest written reference to the name Prospect Hill is probably the account of an after-dinner walk from Parramatta to the hill by Governor Phillip and Lieutenant (later Governor) Philip Gidley King in April 1790. King's account shows that the name Prospect Hill had become established by then.

During the initial struggling years of European settlement in NSW, Governor Phillip began to settle time-expired convicts on the land as farmers, after the success of James Ruse at Rose Hill. On 18 July 1791 Phillip placed a number of men on the eastern and southern slopes of Prospect Hill, as the soils weathered from the basalt cap were richer than the sandstone derived soils of the Cumberland Plain. The grants, mostly , encircled Prospect Hill. The settlers included William Butler, James Castle, Samuel Griffiths, John Herbert, George Lisk, Joseph Morley, John Nichols, William Parish and Edward Pugh.

Aboriginal and European conflict
The arrival of the first settlers prompted the first organised Aboriginal resistance to the spread of settlement, with the commencement of a violent frontier conflict in which Pemulwuy and his Bidjigal clan played a central role. This ended in violent attacks in February 1798 in which dozens of settlers were killed. Retaliation by Europeans was generally fast and austere with many aboriginals killed who had not been involved in the attacks on Europeans. Eventually, a reconciliation was started by the Aboriginal people, negotiated by their women and one of the Prospect Hill settlers, John Kennedy. On 1 May 1801 Governor King took drastic action, issuing a public order requiring that Aboriginal people around Parramatta, Prospect Hill and Georges River should be "driven back from the settlers" habitations by firing at them'. King's edicts appear to have encouraged a shoot-on-sight attitude whenever any Aboriginal men, women or children appeared.

With the death of Pemulwuy, the main resistance leader, in 1802, Aboriginal resistance gradually diminished near Parramatta, although outer areas were still subject to armed hostilities. Prompted by suggestions to the Reverend Samuel Marsden by local Prospect Aboriginal groups that a conference should take place "with a view of opening the way to reconciliation", Marsden promptly organised a meeting near Prospect Hill. At the meeting, held on 3 May 1805, local Aboriginal representatives discussed with Marsden ways of ending the restrictions and indiscriminate reprisals inflicted on them by soldiers and settlers in response to atrocities committed by other Aboriginal clans. The meeting was significant because a group of Aboriginal women and a young free settler at Prospect named John Kennedy acted as intermediaries. The conference led to the end of the conflict for the Aboriginal clans around Parramatta and Prospect. This conference at Prospect on Friday 3 May 1805 is a landmark in Aboriginal/European relations. Macquarie's "Native Feasts" held at Parramatta from 1814 followed the precedent set in 1805. The Sydney Gazette report of the meeting is notable for the absence of the sneering tone that characterised its earlier coverage of Aboriginal matters.

Land use
In 1791 Governor Phillip started granting plots of land (mostly ) to emancipated convicts. Some convicts had spent years in prison and prison ships in England before being transported. Some of those who were under seven-year sentences had therefore completed them. Thirteen grants of land at Prospect Hill were made in July 1791. In 1799 Ensign William Cummings of the New South Wales Corps was granted  at Prospect Hill. From its commencement in 1791 with the early settlement of the area, agricultural use of the land continued at Prospect Hill. Much of the land appears to have been cleared by the 1820s and pastoral use of the land was well established by then. When Governor Macquarie paid a visit to the area in 1810, he was favourably impressed by the comfortable conditions that had been created.

A change in the interpretation of government policy in 1792 had opened the way for grants of land to officers of the New South Wales Marine Corps. Cummings was the first beneficiary of this change. In 1808 William Lawson was granted  on the western slopes of the west ridge where he was to build his home Veteran Hall. He then bought Cummings' grant and it was here that his third son, Nelson Lawson built a magnificent home, Grey Stanes, on the crown of Prospect Hill. Governor Macquarie confirmed the grant, where William Lawson had built a house, which he called "Veteran Hall", because he had a commission in the NSW Veterans Company. The house was demolished in 1928 and the site is now partly covered by the waters of Prospect Reservoir.

Greystanes was approached by a long drive lined with an avenue of English trees - elms (Ulmus procera), hawthorns (Crataegus sp.), holly (Ilex aquifolium), and woodbine (Clematis) mingling with Jacaranda mimosifolia. It had a wide, semi-circular front veranda supported by four pillars. The foundations were of stone, the roof of slate, and the doors and architraves of heavy red cedar. It was richly furnished with articles of the best quality available and was the scene of many glittering soirees attended by the elite of the colony. Honoria Lawson died in 1845, Nelson remarried a year later, but died in 1849, and the property reverted to his father. Greystanes house was demolished in the 1940s. Early grazing practices cleared the entire hill of trees. Quarrying in the area began in the 1820s and naturalist Charles Darwin visited Prospect Hill in January 1836, to observe the geology. By the latter part of the nineteenth century coarse-grained picrite, and other doloritic rock types were being extracted from William Lawson's estate on the west and north sides of the Hill. Veteran Hall and its land were resumed when Prospect Reservoir was built as Sydney's main water supply in the 1880s.

The land was farmed from 1806 to 1888 when the Prospect Reservoir was built. In 1867, the Governor of New South Wales appointed a Commission to recommend a scheme for Sydney's water supply, and by 1869 it was recommended that construction commence on the Upper Nepean Scheme. This consisted of two diversion weirs, located at Pheasant's Nest and Broughton's Pass, in the Upper Nepean River catchment, with water feeding into a series of tunnels, canals and aqueducts known as the Upper Canal. It was intended that water be fed by gravity from the catchment into a reservoir at Prospect. This scheme was to be Sydney's fourth water supply system, following the Tank Stream, Busby's Bore and the Botany (Lachlan) Swamps. Designed and constructed by the NSW Public Works Department, Prospect Reservoir was built during the 1880s and completed in 1888. Credit for the Upper Nepean Scheme is largely given to Edward Orpen Moriarty, the Engineer in Chief of the Harbours and Rivers Branch of the Public Works Department from 1858 to 1888. By the 1870s, with the collapse of the production of cereal grains across the Cumberland Plain, the Prospect Hill area appears to have largely been devoted to livestock. The dwellings of the earliest settlers largely appear to have been removed by this stage. By the time that any mapping was undertaken in this vicinity, most of these structures had disappeared, making their locations difficult to pinpoint.

Modern history
 
Quarrying of the basalt plug at Prospect Hill was well underway by the mid-nineteenth century. By the early twentieth century, Prospect Hill land had been acquired by quarrying firms anxious to expand their land holdings near this valuable source of raw material. The bulk of the present CSIRO site was acquired by the Commonwealth in 1946, and a further 15 hectares was acquired in 1963. In the early 1950s the site became operational and sheep were pastured for research purposes. Prospect Hill was for many years the primary source of road-stone for the city's expanding infrastructure until the reserves of dolerite were exhausted. The Greystanes estate was eventually bought by quarrying interests.

In 1998 Boral reviewed its holdings with a view to future redevelopment as its quarry neared the end of its life. SEPP59 was gazetted in 1999 applying to a number of Western Sydney holdings including Greystanes Estate, Nelsons Ridge, rezoning land on the hill's west for employment and on the hill's eastern side for housing and regional open space and providing precinct planning controls. Boral developed two precinct plans. Holroyd City Council adopted the residential precinct plan in 2002. The then Minister for Urban Affairs & Planning took over planning powers for the employment area in November 2000 and approved the Employment Precinct Plan in June 2001, approving subdivision and associated works in the northern employment lands later in June 2001. Since, parts of the employment land have been sold and further subdivideed and sold.

As at 19 February 2001, The southern portion of Prospect Hill, located within the Boral Brickworks site has been extensively quarried; however the CSIRO site has largely retained its original surface form. Archaeological potential high within the CSIRO site. Long-term pastoral use on much of Prospect Hill has ensured the site retains its historical links and archaeological potential. However, Prospect Hill is under immediate threat from development, which has the potential to impact upon the significance of the site. This includes the rezoning of the site as part of SEPP 59 and development for residential/employment purposes, the continual quarrying of the southern portion of the hill; and new development proposals including a proposed flagpole to be erected on Prospect Hill commemorating Federation. Various modifications, extensions and refurbishment of buildings within CSIRO research complex over time. In 2002 Delfin Lend Lease entered a joint venture with Boral to develop the residential lands. This part of the estate is now known as Nelson's Ridge (after Nelson Lawson who owned the Greystanes Estate and commissioned Greystanes House in 1837). Nelson's Ridge is being developed by Lend Lease in two stages with the first comprising the northern employment and northern residential lands and the second comprising the southern equivalents.

The former CSIRO site to the north of Nelson's Ridge was vacated in 1/2002 and sold to Stockland in March 2002. SEPP 59 also rezoned it for residential and employment uses. This site has its own precinct plan, now adopted into the Holroyd City Council's Development Control Plan: Part P Pemulwuy Residential Lands. It will eventually be integrated with the Nelson's Ridge development through Driftway Drive as well as cycleways and pedestrian links being established between the two. The land inside the oval-shaped ridge was levelled from 2008 to 2010 and is rapidly filling with large industrial buildings. The gap in the ridge that had previously been created by quarrying has been lowered to the floor level of the quarry and the drainage of the area reversed from its earlier northward flow to empty into Prospect Creek, while a new road, Reconciliation Road, has been driven through the centre of the hill from Prospect Highway and across the gap to Wetherill Park.

On 31 December 2019, a grass fire broke out on the hill's pine forest and the contiguous grey box reserve, where it headed north towards Pemulwuy along the Prospect Highway. About 10 hectare size and burning a number of historic Monterey pine trees, the fire impacted a large industrial area and threatened numerous properties before being brought under control by about 9 pm that day.

As of 2021, Boral have begun excavation and preparation of a significant area at the base of the hill for an extension of the housing development of Pemulwuy. The development will sit between the Canal Walkway and the pine forest.

Geography

Rain that falls on the southern slopes of Prospect Hill flows into Prospect Creek and then via the Georges River into Botany Bay. The northern slopes drain into Girraween Creek and eventually into the Parramatta River and Port Jackson (Sydney Harbour). Close by to the west is Prospect Reservoir and beyond it, Eastern Creek flows north-west into the Nepean-Hawkesbury River, the mighty river that encircles Sydney forming the boundary of the Cumberland Plain and eventually flowing into the sea at Broken Bay.

Lying centrally in the Cumberland Plain and dominating the landscape of the area, Prospect Hill is Sydney's largest body of igneous rock and rises to a height of 117 metres above sea level. The hill is located between the south-west corner of CSIRO Division of Animal Production site and the south-east corner of the Boral Resources (NSW) site at Greystanes. The CSIRO portion of Prospect Hill is generally cleared for pasture grasses, with remnant stands of native vegetation along a creek line that runs from north to south along the site. The portion of Prospect Hill located within the Boral site has remnant stands of trees and has been partially used as part of the Boral Brickworks operation.

The first settlement of the area occurred in 1791 on the eastern and southern slopes of Prospect Hill, however no buildings dating from the 18th or 19th century remain above ground. A number of the original boundaries of the Prospect land grants of 1791 can be identified when looking east across the CSIRO site from Prospect Hill. On the slope of Prospect Hill, north of the hilltop, is an abandoned quarry dating to the later part of the 19th century.

Geology

In the Sydney Basin, insignificant igneous activity took place in the Early Jurassic (i.e. 210 million years ago), Late Mesozoic (i.e. 100-90 million years ago) and Cenozoic eras (i.e. 65 million years ago). The Early Jurassic activity resulted in the shaping of the Prospect dolerite intrusion, which unequivocally points that the hill had a volcanic origin. When Australia, then part of the Gondwana supercontinent, began to break up and drift away from Antarctica and Zealandia 80 million years ago, this may have also caused a period of volcanic activity along the east coast, as breakup tension caused deep faults in the continental crust allowing magma to ascent from the mantle regions below the earth's surface.

The eroded residue of the volcanic core forms Prospect Hill, which was battered down over millions of years to a small bulge in the generally flat lands of western Sydney. The dome is referred to as a doleritic laccolith. The next stage of natural development, which has lasted over 60 million years, has been the slow erosion of the overlying layers of sedimentary rock by the flow of rainwater, which eventually laid bare the edges of the volcanic and metamorphic rocks of the intrusion. The hill contains a slender, chilled margin of fine-grained basalt with most of the mass of the intrusion being made up of picrite and dolerite. Volcanic rocks on the hill are predominantly mafic. Minerals, and as well as volcanic material. In the 1960s, small amount of gold was discovered in a sample test, and since then no more has been found.

Summits

The most accurate description of the shape of the ridge is to say that it is J-shaped, with the upright of the J pointing a few degrees east of north. The summits are described in order starting from the top of the "J" and proceeding clockwise round the ridge.
Prospect Lookout: The most northerly summit of Prospect Hill, it is  northwards from Greystanes Hill and is clearly visible from the junction of Blacktown Road and the Great Western Highway. It was a popular picnic spot in the 1920s. The ridge between it and Greystanes Hill to the south was cut through by a quarry road, now improved as Butu Wargun Drive but with a barrier to vehicular traffic at the point where it crosses the ridge. Access to this summit is from the Clunies Ross Street, although the gates have been closed since 2017.
The summit area contains a recreational lookout area that features panoramic eastward views of the Sydney CBD, walking tracks, public seating and native plants. From the summit itself there are views of the Blue Mountains to the west. To the east one can see panoramic views of Sydney CBD (including the Sydney Harbour Bridge), Sydney Olympic Park, Parramatta and also the woody North Shore to the north. On its eastern side the ridge descends through steep scrub to Daruga Avenue in Pemulwuy. To the west there is the restituted face of Prospect Quarry. A larger area stretching southwards is also designated as Marrong Reserve. To note, this hill is colloquially known as Pemulwuy Lookout.
One-Tree Hill: This hill has a prominent Moreton Bay fig tree, dated to be over 150 years old, which was within the precincts of Grey Stanes, the house of Nelson Lawson. Although inaccessible to the public, the hill can be viewed from Prospect Highway south of the M4 or from Daruga Avenue, Pemulwuy. The hill is just to the south of Greystanes Hill.
The South Top: The summit ridge is fairly level but with steep sides. The western part of the Lower Prospect Canal Reserve walkway and cycleway runs along the foot of the hill's southeast slopes. The lower slopes feature Pampas grass, Ipomoea cairica, Lantana camara, Acacia longifolia and the upper slopes prominently consist a plantation of Monterey pine trees with a few Grey Box and Casuarina trees. Kangaroos and blind snakes are found on the grassy slopes. The hilltop provides panoramic views to the south of Greater Western Sydney. The summit is observable from the suburbs of Smithfield and Wetherill Park in the City of Fairfield. By car, this summit can be entered from Hyland Road in the southeast or Prospect Highway in the southwest, as the walkway leading to it straddles the highway.
Reservoir Hill: Just to the south of Water Tower Hill, this hill faces Prospect Reservoir and is in the suburb of Prospect within City of Blacktown local government area. Situated in Prospect Nature Reserve, the hill (also known as George Maunder Lookouts) contains scenic picnic spots. The foot of the Hill is accessible via William Lawson Drive during the Prospect Reservoir opening hours.
Water Tower Hill: There are two water towers on the summit and a covered reservoir nearby (one being Prospect Hill Reservoir). It is inaccessible to the public.

Heritage listing 
As at 19 February 2001, the Prospect Hill area had state significance due to its unique combination of significant landscape feature, potential archaeological site, and association with important historical phases.

The site is significant as a major reference point for early explorers from 1788, and as the site of a number of the earliest farms in New South Wales, which were established in 1791. Prospect Hill is also associated with Aboriginal frontier warfare during the early days of the colony, and as the site of one of the first Aboriginal/ European reconciliation meetings held in 1805 involving Samuel Marsden and Prospect Aboriginal groups.

Through its ongoing pastoral and rural use, the site has the potential to provide archaeological evidence of early farming practice and settlement. The landscape of Prospect Hill is likely to be one of the only remaining areas of rural land within the local and regional area that has retained its long-term pastoral use since the earliest days of the colony.

Criteria
Prospect Hill was listed on the New South Wales State Heritage Register on 17 October 2003 having satisfied the following criteria.

The place is important in demonstrating the course, or pattern, of cultural or natural history in New South Wales.

Prospect Hill is historically significant as the site of a number of the earliest farms in New South Wales, with a number of time-expired convicts settled on the land in 1791 by Governor Phillip. As a significant landmark on the Cumberland Plain, Prospect Hill provided an important reference point for early explorers from 1788, and played a role in the earliest exploration of the east coast of Australia. Prospect Hill is also associated with an important phase of Aboriginal/European contact; firstly through Pemulwuy's guerilla warfare in the area between 1797 and 1802, and in 1805 as the site of a reconciliation meeting involving Samuel Marsden.

Prospect Hill has historical associations arising from the use of the site over time; including the Aboriginal frontier leader Pemulwuy, Samuel Marsden and those earliest former convicts who settled at Prospect Hill including William Butler, Samuel Griffiths and William Parish.

The place is important in demonstrating aesthetic characteristics and/or a high degree of creative or technical achievement in New South Wales.

Prospect Hill has aesthetic significance as Sydney's largest body of igneous rock, which rises to a height of 117 metres and provides expansive views across the Cumberland Plain. The large dolerite formation of Prospect Hill is a rare geological and landmark topographic feature, lying centrally within the Cumberland Plain. Through the long-term use of the site for pastoral use, the landscape retains an essentially rural character, which is becoming rare in the locality.

The place has strong or special association with a particular community or cultural group in New South Wales for social, cultural or spiritual reasons.

Through its continued use for research purposes over the last 40 years, the CSIRO complex, which is located at the foot of Prospect Hill, has significance for those employees who have worked at the research facility, and in particular for those scientists who have carried out work which is of importance to Australia';s cultural history.

The place has potential to yield information that will contribute to an understanding of the cultural or natural history of New South Wales.

Through its continual pastoral/rural use since 1791, Prospect Hill has the potential to provide archaeological evidence of early historical settlement or agricultural techniques used.

The place possesses uncommon, rare or endangered aspects of the cultural or natural history of New South Wales.

Prospect Hill is unique as a significant landmark site, and through its ability to demonstrate historical links with early European exploration and settlement as well as Aboriginal conflict and reconciliation, with the landscape retaining its continual pastoral use since the early days of the colony.

Gallery

See also 

Prospect, a suburb nearby
Prospect Reservoir, a nearby reservoir
Lower Prospect Canal Reserve
Geography of Sydney

References

Bibliography

Attribution

External links

Prospect Hill – Introduction

Geography of Sydney
Landmarks in Sydney
Climbing areas of Australia
Hills of New South Wales
Nature reserves in New South Wales
Parks in Sydney
Parks in New South Wales
Quarries in Australia
Prospect, New South Wales
New South Wales State Heritage Register
Farms in New South Wales
Brickworks in Australia
Industrial buildings in New South Wales
Homesteads in New South Wales
Research institutes in Australia
Articles incorporating text from the New South Wales State Heritage Register
Landforms of Sydney